Sertorelli is an Italian surname. Notable people with the surname include:

 Erminio Sertorelli (1901–1979), Italian cross-country skier
 Giacinto Sertorelli (1914–1938), Italian alpine skier
 Stefano Sertorelli (1911–1994), Italian soldier and skier

Italian-language surnames